Ghulam Mustafa Khan (3 March 1931 – 17 January 2021) was an Indian classical musician in the Hindustani classical music tradition, belonging to the Rampur-Sahaswan Gharana.

He was awarded the Padma Shri in 1991, followed by Padma Bhushan in 2006 and Padma Vibhushan in 2018. In 2003 he was awarded the Sangeet Natak Akademi Award, the highest Indian recognition given to practicing artists by the Sangeet Natak Akademi, India's National Academy for Music, Dance and Drama.

Early life

Ustad Ghulam Mustafa Khan was born in Badayun, Uttar Pradesh. His mother was the daughter of the great Ustad Inayat Hussain Khan and music was the legacy of his family. Inayat Hussain Khan was also the court musician during the reign of king Wajid Ali Shah and also the son-in-law of the pioneer of Gwalior Gharana Haddu Khan.

Since both Ustad Ghulam Mustafa Khan's parents wanted him to be a singer, his training in music started very young at a time when he could remember the tune but could not understand the words. After his father, he was trained by Ustaad Fida Hussain Khan who was the court singer at the Baroda's royal durbar, and then from Nissar Hussain Khan. The traditional styles of Rampur, Gwalior and Sahaswan gharanas are therefore part of his performance.

At the time, every city had a Victoria Garden and it was the custom that on Janmashtami, the first public performance of those interested in music be performed as a debut. Ali Maqsood, the Chairman of the Municipality, organised the Janmashtami function every year and asked Ghulam Mustafa Khan to perform when he was 8 years old.

Ustad Ghulam Mustafa Khan's cousin brother in law, Hafeez Ahmed Khan was the Deputy Chief Producer with All India Radio.

Career

Ghulam Mustafa was awarded the Padmashri in 1991, the Sangeet Natak Academy Award in 2003, the Padmabhushan in 2006, and the Padma Vibhushan in 2018.

The first film he sang for was in Marathi, ‘Chand Pretticha’. From 1957, he started singing playback for Marathi and Gujarati films. He started with Mrinal Sen’s ‘Bhuvan Shome’ and sang ‘Sajanaa kahe nahi aaye...’  for ‘Badnaam Basti’ under the same music director, Vijay Raghav Rao. He played the role of Baiju Bawra in a German Documentary "Rain Maker" shot in Jaipur, besides being playback singer in the same film. He has given his voice to more than 70 documentary films made by Films Division, many of them receiving international & National Awards. He has performed across India and European countries.

From the late 50s, he has been a guru to Asha Bhosle, Manna Dey, Kamal Barot, Waheeda Rehman, Ranu Mukherjee, Geeta Dutt, A. R. Rahman, Hariharan, Shaan and Sonu Nigam, Sanah Moidutty, Zubeen Garg, Jonkey Borthakur, Bhitali Das, Sagarika, Alisha Chinoy, Shilpa Rao, and Kalpana Patowary was one of his students. Aftab Ahmad Khan is his youngest brother & disciple. His four sons Ghulam Murtuza, Ghulam Qadir, Rabbani Mustafa Khana and Ghulam Hasan Khan were also trained by him. Currently they are professional singers and have sung in films like ‘Fiza’,‘Meenaxi: A Tale of Three Cities’ and ‘Saathiya’. His grandsons Faiz and Aamir were also receiving their taalim from him.

In Coke Studio, composer A. R. Rahman shared the stage with his 82-year-old guru, also featuring his four sons- Murtuza, Qadir, Rabbani and Hasan- and his 12-year-old grandson, Faiz. All five vocalists and Rahman collaborated on two numbers as a part of Ghulam Mustafa Khan's 3 generation performance.

Personal life

Ghulam Mustafa Khan was married to Amina Begum who is grand daughter of Padma Bhushan Mushtaq Hussain Khan. They had four sons who are Murtuza Mustafa, Qadir Mustafa, Rabbani Mustafa and Hasan Mustafa.

Death
Khan died on 17 January 2021 at his residence in Mumbai, aged 89.

Awards and achievements

National awards
Padma Shri (1991) – conferred by Shri R.Venkatraman (Honorable President of India). Fourth highest Indian civilian award
Sangeet Natak Akademi Award (2003) – conferred by Shri APJ Abdul Kalam, Honourable President of India. It is the highest Indian recognition given to practicing artists given by Sangeet Natak Akademi, India's National Academy for Music, Dance and Drama.
Padma Bhushan (2006) – conferred by Shri APJ Abdul Kalam (Honourable President of India). The Padma Bhushan is the third-highest civilian award in the Republic of India.
Padma Vibhushan (2018)  – 2nd highest civilian award in India

Other awards
Conferred prestigious 'National Tansen Samman’ by the Government of Madhya Pradesh in the year 2008. It is a musical award conferred to the exponents[4] of Hindustani music in the year 2008.
Pandit Dinanath Mangeshkar Award in 2011 by Smt. Lata Mangeshkar.
Conferred "Uttam Vag- Geykar Jialal Vasant Award" In 2014 by Hon’ble Shri Dilip Walse – Patil.(Speaker of Maharashtra Legislative Assembly). The award is constituted by Acharya Jialal Vasant Sangeet Niketan as a token symbolising strong foundation awarded to Ustad Ghulam Mustafa Khan to recognise the incredible journey of music that has been and is still on and for contributing to the country.
Conferred Yash Bharti Award in 2016 by Uttar Pradesh Chief Minister Akhilesh Yadav for earning laurel for the state in the country as well as in the world with his talent.
Conferred the Ustad Haafiz Ali Khan award in 2003 by Shri Ram Vilas Paswan.
Conferred the Ustad Chand Khan award.
Conferred Pandit Basavaraj Rajguru National Memorial Trust award in 2016 by Minister Santosh Lad. The national award was instituted by the Swarasamrat Pandit Basavaraj Rajguru National Memorial Trust at Srujana Auditorium at Dharwad. Mustafa also presented a vocal recital on the occasion accompanied by Gulam Sultan Niyaz on the tabla, Ananth Kemkar on harmonium, and Liyakhat Ali Khan on sarangi.
Honorary Citizenship for outstanding contribution to the field of Indian Classical Music in 1986 (by Governor of Maryland)
He performed at Baltimore University and was conferred an Honorary Citizenship of Baltimore City.
He performed at Golden Jubilee in the presence of the honorable Queen of United Kingdom.
He performed at Festival de Lille in the presence of Lady Diana in France.
He was honoured with Maharashtra Sanskrutik Puraskar.
He was honoured with Tagore Ratna Award instituted by Central Sangeet Natak Academy in 2011.

Discography

Filmography (Playbacks)

This a filmography for Ghulam Mustafa Khan's playbacks in Indian Film Industry.

Filmography (Music Direction)

This a filmography for Ghulam Mustafa Khan's projects as a Music Director in Indian Film Industry.

Non Film (Singer)

This is the Non Film Work of Ghulam Mustafa Khan.

Collaborative Projects

Non Film [Music Direction] 

This is the Non Film Work of Ustad Ghulam Mustafa Khan as the Music Director.

References

External links
 Official site
 
 

1931 births
2021 deaths
Hindustani singers
Indian music educators
21st-century Indian Muslims
People from Budaun
Recipients of the Padma Shri in arts
Recipients of the Padma Bhushan in arts
Recipients of the Sangeet Natak Akademi Award
20th-century Indian male classical singers
Recipients of the Padma Vibhushan in arts
21st-century Indian male classical singers